The Redknife River is a river in the Northwest Territories of Canada. It is a major tributary of the Mackenzie River.

The Redknife Formation, a stratigraphical unit of the Western Canadian Sedimentary Basin was named for the river.

Course
It flows east down the slopes of the hill, then turns north, draws water from a lake system, then turns north-east.

See also
List of rivers of the Northwest Territories

References

Rivers of the Northwest Territories
Tributaries of the Mackenzie River